Living in a Box are a British band founded in 1985. They are best known for their eponymous debut single, produced by Richard James Burgess. The group currently consists of founding members Anthony "Tich" Critchlow (drums) and Marcus Vere (keyboards, synthesizers) along with vocalist Kenny Thomas.

Career

Formation and split
Living in a Box were formed in 1985 in Sheffield. The group named themselves after the first song they had recorded together in the studio. It was in fact this song that had brought them together in the first place. Vere and Critchlow were recording the demo version of the tune in a studio also being visited by Richard Darbyshire, an independent recording artist at the time. Richard was invited to join his two future bandmates in the studio to record vocals for the track, and the three officially became a band.

Released two years later, "Living in a Box" was their most commercially successful single, peaking at #5 on the UK Singles Chart and became the band's only single to chart in the Top 40 of the Billboard Hot 100 in the US. The single was featured on the group's self-titled debut album, which also included follow-up singles "Love is the Art", "So the Story Goes", and "Scales of Justice". While "So the Story Goes" was the only one of these additional singles to crack the US Billboard Hot 100, all three songs charted in their home country, where the band continued to enjoy more success. Their follow-up album, Gatecrashing in 1989 proved to be even more successful in the UK, generating two Top Ten hits, "Blow the House Down" (which featured Queen's Brian May on guitar) and "Room in Your Heart". The album itself peaked at #21. Artistic differences, as well as changes to their record label Chrysalis, caused the band to break up in 1990 before a third album could be released.

After Living in a Box
Frontman Richard Darbyshire has continued his long-standing music career, writing songs for artists such as Lisa Stansfield and briefly enjoying modest success as a solo artist. His solo album, How Many Angels (1994) has been re-released a number of times (beginning in 1999, when it was re-issued under the title of Love Will Provide) accompanied by various new and unreleased tracks.

Anthony "Tich" Critchlow and Marcus Charles Vere temporarily retired from the music industry after the band split. Tich runs his own company providing bespoke illumination and lighting installations.

After a brief break, Vere changed direction and produced an award-winning series of educational DVDs called Here Comes A...! for pre-school aged children; topics include live action films about tractors, diggers, trains and fire engines. The business moved online in early 2017 as Kids Trucks TV and has become a phenomenal success on YouTube. In May 2016, Vere was credited with writing the songs "Viva Love", "Flames of Desire", "Kiss Me Goodbye" and "Ten Below Zero" on the Top 5 ABC album Lexicon of Love II.

Grand Theft Auto V
In 2013, the band’s song “Living In A Box” was featured on the soundtrack of the action adventure video game Grand Theft Auto V, created by Rockstar Games. It is the second biggest selling video game of all time with 160 million units sold, as of April 2018.

Living in a Box reform
In 2016, Living in a Box reformed with British soul singer Kenny Thomas replacing Darbyshire. In summer 2022, they announced via Twitter that they have a new singer, Bryan Chambers. Since they have reformed, the band has appeared at live festival events in the UK such as Let's Rock, Rewind and Flashback and continue to play gigs on a regular basis.

Legacy
The song "Living in a Box" was later covered by Bobby Womack, who had also worked with Living in a Box on the single, "So the Story Goes".

Personnel
Current members
Anthony "Tich" Critchlow – drums (1985–1990, 2016–present)
Marcus Charles Vere  – keyboards, synthesizers (1985–1990, 2016–present)
Bryan Chambers – vocals (2022–present)

Past members
Richard Darbyshire – vocals, guitar (1985–1990)
Kenny Thomas – vocals (2016–2022)

Discography

Studio albums

Singles

References

External links
 
 Richard Darbyshire official website
 Discogs.com entry
 [ Living in a Box biography and discography] at AllMusic website

Musical groups established in 1985
Musical groups disestablished in 1990
Musical groups reestablished in 2016
English pop music groups
Chrysalis Records artists
Musical groups from Sheffield
Sophisti-pop musical groups
1985 establishments in England
English funk musical groups